Village of Idiots is a short animated comedy based on the classic humorous Jewish folk tales of Chełm, directed and animated by Eugene Fedorenko and Rose Newlove, written by John Lazarus, and produced by the National Film Board of Canada (NFB). Fedorenko is the Academy Award-winning animator of the 1979 NFB short Every Child. In 1999, it was one of four films in the 1st Annual Animation Show of Shows.

Summary
“Outsiders call Chełm the village of idiots," Shmendrick explains, "but our rabbi said we were a city of natural geniuses, with our own way of figuring things out.”

With muted, mesmerizing illustrations and heavy accordion-based music, the film follows Shmendrick as he sets out on a journey away from home for the first time. But along his journey from Chełm to Warsaw, He decides to have a rest. He then eats some food that he brought with him and then has a sleep. Afterwards, Shmendrick awakens and continues his journey. But as he travels, he comes upon a city that is eerily similar to the one he left behind. The rest of us might think Shmendrik just took a wrong turn and ended up back home, but for Shmendrik, this discovery sheds light on holy teachings: “the Talmud tells us that the world is everywhere the same," he recalls.

Awards
 CINANIMA International Animated Film Festival, Espinho, Portugal: RTP Internacional Jury Honorable Mention, 1999
 CINANIMA International Animated Film Festival, Espinho, Portugal: Special Jury Award, 1999
 CINANIMA International Animated Film Festival, Espinho, Portugal: Audience Award, 1999
 Vancouver International Film Festival, Vancouver: Best Animated Film, 1999
 Montreal World Film Festival, Montreal: FIPRESCI Award International Federation of Film Critics, 1999
 Montreal World Film Festival, Montreal: Second Prize, Short Films, 1999
 Writers Guild of Canada: Best Script, to John Lazarus, 1999
 Castelli Animati, Genzano di Roma, Italy: Grand Prize, 2000
 Curtas Vila do Conde International Film Festival, Vila do Conde, Portugal: Grand Prize for Animation, 2000
 International Jewish Video Competition of the Judah L. Magnes Museum, Berkeley, California: First Prize, Animation, 2000
 Hiroshima International Animation Festival, Hiroshima, Japan: Renzo Kinoshita Award, 2000
 Palm Springs International Festival of Short Films, Palm Springs, California: Second Place, Animation, 2000
 Animafest Zagreb, Zagreb, Croatia: Second Prize, 2000
 Message to Man International Film Festival, St. Petersburg, Russia – Centaur Award for Best Animation, 2000
 Annecy International Animation Film Festival, Annecy, France: Special Jury Award, 2000
 Brisbane International Film Festival, Brisbane, Australia: Special Jury Award, 2000
 Melbourne International Animation Festival, Melbourne: Award for Best of International Session 6, 2001
 California SUN International Animation Festival, Los Angeles: Silver Star Award for Best Experimental Animation, 2001
 21st Genie Awards, Toronto – Genie Award for Best Animated Short, 2001
 New York International Children's Film Festival, New York: Grand Prize Audience Award, 2002

See also
The Witch from Melchet Street
A Story about a Bad Dream
Alan and Naomi

References

External links
 
 Watch Village of Idiots at the National Film Board of Canada

1999 animated films
1999 films
1999 short films
1990s animated short films
Films about Jews and Judaism
Films based on folklore
Canadian animated short films
Best Animated Short Film Genie and Canadian Screen Award winners
Jewish comedy and humor
National Film Board of Canada animated short films
Quebec films
1990s English-language films
1990s Canadian films